Linda A. Hill is an American ethnographer currently the Wallace Brett Donham Professor of Business Administration at Harvard Business School.

Bibliography

See a full Bibliography here: https://www.hbs.edu/faculty/Pages/profile.aspx?facId=6479&view=publications

References

Year of birth missing (living people)
Living people
Harvard Business School faculty
American ethnographers
University of Chicago alumni
Bryn Mawr College alumni